Maillé-Brézé may refer to:

People
 Urbain de Maillé-Brézé (1597–1650), Marshal of France, General, Top French aristocrat
 Jean Armand de Maillé-Brézé (1619–1646), French First Grand Admiral
 Claire-Clémence de Maillé-Brézé (1628–1694), wife of Louis II de Bourbon, Prince de Condé

Other
 French ship Maillé Brézé:
 French destroyer Maillé Brézé (1931)
 French destroyer Maillé-Brézé (D627)